Tifft is a surname. Notable people with the surname include:

Matt Tifft (born 1996), American racing driver
Susan Tifft (1951–2010), American journalist, author, and educator
William G. Tifft, American astronomer

See also
Tift (disambiguation)